Chiselet is a commune in Călărași County, Muntenia, Romania. It is composed of a single village, Chiselet.

As of 2007 the population of Chiselet is 3,554.

A massive Neolithic tell called Măgura Fundeanca exists just a few kilometers south of the village center, towards the often flooded forest that borders the bank of the Danube.

References

Chiselet
Localities in Muntenia